The Greater Cleveland Sports Hall of Fame is a nonprofit organization in Cleveland, Ohio. It was established in 1976 to honor Greater Clevelanders who were outstanding in sport. Greater Cleveland is defined as Ashtabula, Cuyahoga, Geauga, Lake, Lorain and Medina counties. Inductees must have been raised in Greater Cleveland or have become residents of Greater Cleveland. Also inductee must have been retired for at least three years or, if still actively playing, must have competed at a quality level in their sport for at least 12 years. New members are honored at an annual induction ceremony.

The Hall of Fame started as a bicentennial project. The first class in 1976 included 151 inductees while recent years have seen eight inductees per year. Up to 2016, a total of 508 people have been selected, with 15 being selected in more than one category, bringing the total to 524 inductions in 30 categories.

Inductees receive a plaque with a line drawing of the inductee and the sport they represent, presented at an annual ceremony. Copies of many of these plaques can be found in the lobby of the Cleveland Public Auditorium in downtown Cleveland.

References

External links 

 http://www.clevelandsportshall.com/

Halls of fame in Ohio
Sports in Greater Cleveland
All-sports halls of fame